Smilax officinalis is a species of flowering plant in the family Smilacaceae, native to southern Central America and northwest South America; Honduras, Nicaragua, Costa Rica, Panama, Colombia, and Ecuador. A vine reaching  as it climbs trees into the canopy, its roots are collected and used to make traditional medicines and, like other Smilax species, the soft drink sarsaparilla.

References

Smilacaceae
Flora of Honduras
Flora of Nicaragua
Flora of Costa Rica
Flora of Panama
Flora of Colombia
Flora of Ecuador
Plants described in 1816